Alexander's Church is a church of the Estonian Evangelical Lutheran Church in Narva, Estonia. Narva Church's original cornerstone was laid in summer 1881. It was congregated after Emperor Alexander II in fall 1883, after his assassination earlier in spring. The church was consecrated on 9 June 1884. It was given cathedral status by President Lennart Meri on 19 September 2000.

St. Alexander’s congregation of Narva went bankrupt in 2015 due to the congregation’s inability to meet financial obligations related to the reconstruction of the church tower. The cathedral building was to be auctioned, but after several requests, the auction was called off and the building was purchased by the Estonian Government and the Estonian Evangelical Lutheran Church for 375,000 euros.

References

Lutheran churches in Estonia
Buildings and structures in Narva
Religious buildings and structures completed in 1884
1884 in Estonia
Buildings and structures in Ida-Viru County